Brita Filter, the stage name of Jesse Carl Havea, is an American drag queen who has appeared on Shade: Queens of NYC and the twelfth season of RuPaul's Drag Race, ultimately placing 8th.

Early life and career
Havea was born in Anthem, Arizona before moving to Dover-Foxcroft, Maine as a kid. She is of Tongan descent. 
Havea was born and raised Mormon.
Havea grew up as a child performer, and later went on to book national tours with theater companies and eventually studied acting at the American Musical and Dramatic Academy. He later became a stage actor and performed in various regional and national productions. He landed the role of a stepsister in the musical production of Cinderella. On the last night of his tenure with this production, Havea met a girl named "Brita" and decided to make "Brita Filter" his stage name that night. He then returned to Manhattan and started his business performing as Brita Filter, a drag queen, stating, "So after that finished, I came back to New York that day, and I decided I was going to take over New York!"

In 2016, Havea won the 2016 Glam Awards for Best Duo alongside fellow drag artist Terra Hyman. In 2018, she won the Best Host and the NYC Entertainer of the Year Award at the Annual Glam Awards. In 2020, Havea co-hosted the 21st annual GLAM Awards, alongside Bob the Drag Queen.

Havea performed alongside Katy Perry on Saturday Night Live, performing her song "Swish Swish".

Havea starred in a segment called "How Drag Queens Are Getting Out the Vote" on The Daily Show with Trevor Noah, along with RuPaul's Drag Race Season 12 co-stars Jaida Essence Hall, Heidi N. Closet and Jackie Cox.

Havea is a co-chair of Drag Out The Vote, a nonpartisan nonprofit that works with drag performers to promote participation in democracy.

Havea joined the cast of Shade: Queens of NYC at its inception in October 2017, as Brita Filter. The series documents the daily reality of lives as Manhattan drag queens.

On January 23, 2020, Havea was announced as one of the thirteen contestants on the twelfth season of RuPaul's Drag Race, becoming the first Pasifika queen to appear on the show. To protect copyright, his stage name on the show is shortened from "Brita Filter" to simply "Brita". In the fourth episode, "The Ball Ball", Havea lipsynced for her life against Rock M Sakura, sending them home to "S&M" by Rihanna. She later found herself again in the bottom two in episode six, where she lipsynced for her life against Aiden Zhane, to "Let It Go" by Caissie Levy, where Brita also sent Aiden home. She was in the bottom two again on episode seven, where she lipsynced for her life against Heidi N. Closet, to "Burning Up" by Madonna, Havea lost the lipsync and went home.

Brita placed 8th overall in the competition.

Personal life
Havea is pansexual, and their preferred pronouns are "anything respectful".

Filmography

Film

Television

Web series

Theatre

Discography

Featured singles

Awards and nominations

See also
 LGBT culture in New York City
 List of LGBT people from New York City

References

External links
 
 

Living people
American drag queens
American people of Polynesian descent
LGBT people from Arizona
LGBT people from New York (state)
Pansexual people
People from Arizona
Brita Filter
American people of Tongan descent
1985 births